Roger Peter Daniel (born 22 February 1970 in Port of Spain) is a Trinidad and Tobago sport shooter who competes in the men's 10 metre air pistol and men's 50 metre pistol. At the 2012 Summer Olympics, he finished 36th in the qualifying round of the 10 metre air pistol competition, failing to make the cut for the final.  He came 35th in the 50 metre pistol event.

References

Trinidad and Tobago male sport shooters
Living people
Olympic shooters of Trinidad and Tobago
Shooters at the 2004 Summer Olympics
Shooters at the 2008 Summer Olympics
Shooters at the 2012 Summer Olympics
1970 births
Sportspeople from Port of Spain
Shooters at the 2003 Pan American Games
Shooters at the 2011 Pan American Games
Shooters at the 2015 Pan American Games
Pan American Games silver medalists for Trinidad and Tobago
Commonwealth Games silver medallists for Trinidad and Tobago
Commonwealth Games bronze medallists for Trinidad and Tobago
Shooters at the 2006 Commonwealth Games
Shooters at the 2010 Commonwealth Games
Commonwealth Games medallists in shooting
Pan American Games medalists in shooting
Central American and Caribbean Games gold medalists for Trinidad and Tobago
Central American and Caribbean Games silver medalists for Trinidad and Tobago
Central American and Caribbean Games bronze medalists for Trinidad and Tobago
Competitors at the 2002 Central American and Caribbean Games
Competitors at the 2006 Central American and Caribbean Games
Central American and Caribbean Games medalists in shooting
Medalists at the 2011 Pan American Games
Medallists at the 2006 Commonwealth Games